In molecular biology, the small nucleolar RNA SNORA73 (also called U17/E1 RNA) belongs to the H/ACA class of small nucleolar RNAs (snoRNAs). Vertebrate U17 is intron-encoded and ranges in length from 200-230 nucleotides, longer than most snoRNAs. It is one of the most abundant snoRNAs in human cells and is essential for the cleavage of pre-rRNA within the 5' external transcribed spacer (ETS). This cleavage leads to the formation of 18S rRNA. Regions of the U17 RNA are complementary to rRNA and act as guides for RNA/RNA interactions, although these regions do not seem to be well conserved between organisms.

There is evidence that SNORA73 (isoforms: SNORA73A and SNORA73B) functions as a regulator of chromatin function. SNORA73 is chromatin-associated RNA (caRNA) and stably linked to chromatin. Notably, SNORA73 can bind to PARP1, leading to the activation of its ADPRylation (PAR) function. SNORA73 Interacts with the PARP1 DNA-Binding Domain. In addition, the snoRNA-activated PARP1 ADPRylates DDX21 in cells to promote cell proliferation.

See also 
Small nucleolar SNORD12/SNORD106

References

External links 
 

Small nuclear RNA